Lookhi, formerly known as Lakhipur, is a village in Kosli Tehsil, Rewari district, Haryana, India. It is located on the Kosli–Kanina road and is equidistant from both cities. With a population of 6,000 to 8,000 people, Lookhi is a relatively large village.

Dr. Abhay Singh Rao was the first person from Lookhi to become a Deputy Commissioner of Police (DCP) in the Haryana Police Department. He was also India's first sub-inspector (SI) with a PhD in Criminal Studies.

Singh's elder brother, Rajpal Yadav, was the first man from the village to join the Indian Air Force.

Many people in this village are commissioned as airmen, such as Devprakash Sharma and Devender Kumar who served 20 years in the Indian Air Force. Others, like Adhikari Devender Singh, who has witnessed to save 114 People during tsunami at Andaman and Nicobar islands and many more in the Central Industrial Security Force (CISF). Officers from this village also include Durgesh Prasad Sharma who is serving as Commander in the Indian Navy. Many personal also joined Indian Navy like Rajbir, Arvind,Agamdeep,Dinesh sharma,Sonu
and many more serving the nation.

Lookhi has an Arya Samaj temple. The temple was paved in 1957 by prospective Arya shepherds of the village. Hawan and certain cultural activities have been performed in the Arya Samaj temple to promote peace and calmness in the village.

The village is known for contributing to the movement of Indian independence. Over 47 residents of Lookhi have participated in the Indian Independence Movement.

Education
The village is noted for its inclusion of women in society. A majority of women can read, and every third house has a teacher. Thus, the village has a total of over 310 teachers.

References

See also
 Karoli, India
 Yaduvanshi Ahirs
 Kosli
 Kanina khas
 Rewari
 Mahendragarh
 Yadav caste

Villages in Rewari district